Manki may refer to:

Manki, Honnavar, a village in Karnataka, India
Manki Sharif, Nowshera District Pakistan
Manki, Swabi, Swabi District Pakistan
Manki, Papua New Guinea
Mańki, Poland

Peoples
Manki is also a surname in Munda community of Jharkhand, India

See also
 Mankey (Pokémon character)